Professional Tour Golf is a golf video game published by Strategic Simulations for the Apple II and Commodore 64 in 1983..

Gameplay
Professional Tour Golf is a game in which professional golf is simulated using pro golfer stats.

Reception
Roy Wagner reviewed the game for Computer Gaming World, and stated that "PTG is an excellent statistical simulation of golf both in play realism and in what can be learned for playing real golf with all the play options available, you will not get bored of this game very quickly."

References

External links
1984 Software Encyclopedia from Electronic Games
Review in Softalk
Review in Family Computing

1983 video games
Apple II games
Commodore 64 games
Golf video games
Strategic Simulations games
Video games developed in the United States